Zara may refer to:

Businesses
 Zara (retailer), a fashion retail company based in Spain
 Zara Investment Holding, a Jordanian holding company
 Continental Hotel Zara, Budapest, Hungary
  Zarawind, an airborne wind energy system company based in Zürich Switzerland since 2017

Music 
 ZaRa, an EP by Merzbow
 "Zara", a 2011 single by Arty

People and fictional characters
 Zara (name), primarily a given name, including a list of people and fictional characters with the given name or surname
 Zara (Turkish singer), stage name of Turkish folk singer and actress Neşe Yılmaz (born 1976)
 Zara (Russian singer), Russian pop singer and actress Zarifa Pashaevna Mgoyan (born 1983)

Places
 Province of Zara, a province of the Kingdom of Italy from 1918 to 1947
 Zara, Turkey, a town and district of Sivas Province
 Zadar, Croatia, whose Italian name is Zara

Ships
 , an Austro-Hungarian torpedo cruiser of the 19th century
 USS Zara (SP-133), a patrol vessel that served in the United States Navy from 1917 to 1919
 Zara-class of Italian heavy cruisers
 Italian cruiser Zara, a heavy cruiser that served in the Italian Navy from 1931 to 1941

Other uses
 Zara (game), a dice game
 Zara (Milan Metro), a railway station in Milan, Italy
 158 Infantry Division Zara, Italian infantry division of World War II
 Zorya, also spelled Zara, in Slavic folklore, a personification of dawn, possibly a goddess
 ZARA, an acronym referring to the ports of Zeebrugge, Antwerp, Rotterdam and Amsterdam

See also
 Zara Spook, a fishing lure
 Zahra (name)
 Zarah (disambiguation)
 Zarya (disambiguation)